Radio Kaos is a multinational member rock band formed in Los Angeles in 1992. The band currently features Claudio Pérez (lead Vocals and lyrics/music composer ) and David Pérez (back vocals and Guitar). The release of their first album Botas Negras (1995) under EMI Capitol was a success in Mexico. Their most recent album, Out in the Blue, was released in 2003.

Discography 
1996: Botas Negras (or "Black Boots" in English)
1998: Radio Kaos
2003: Out in the Blue

External links 
 http://www.chilango.com/musica/nota/2011/11/17/la-botas-negras-de-regreso
 http://www.razon.com.mx/spip.php?article99222
Indyrock article on Radio Kaos (in Spanish)

Rock music groups from California
Musical groups from Los Angeles